Kirsty Law (born 11 October 1986) is a Scottish athlete specialising in the discus throw.

She became British champion when winning the discus throw event at the 2020 British Athletics Championships with a throw of 57.95 metres and defeating six times champion Jade Lally.

References

Living people
1986 births
Scottish female discus throwers
British female discus throwers
Commonwealth Games competitors for Scotland
Athletes (track and field) at the 2014 Commonwealth Games
British Athletics Championships winners